David Zucker is an American film director, producer, and screenwriter.

David Zucker may also refer to:

 David Zucker (ice hockey) (born 1987), Czech ice hockey player 
 David Zucker (politician) (born 1948), Israeli peace activist and former politician 
 David W. Zucker, American television producer

See also
 David Zuckerman (disambiguation)